The 1912 United States presidential election in Utah was held on November 5, 1912 as part of the 1912 United States presidential election. State voters chose four representatives, or electors to the Electoral College, who voted for president and vice president.

Background
After being overwhelmingly carried by William Jennings Bryan in its first presidential election from its statehood year of 1896, Utah was to vote Republican by increasing margins in the following three elections, with only Washington County in the Dixie region voting Democratic in 1904 and 1908. By 1909, there were just two Democrats in the state legislature – a number fewer than any other state except Michigan during the middle 1900s and 1920s.

However, during William Howard Taft's presidency, his predecessor Theodore Roosevelt became bitterly opposed to his policies on foreign affairs and the opening of public lands to private concerns. and thus decided to run in Republican primaries. Roosevelt's personal popularity and a powerful speaking tour was sufficient for him to "steamroll" through primaries, but Taft was able to prevail as the Republican nominee through traditional machine and party tactics. Reformers bolted the Republicans and formed the "Progressive" or "Bull Moose" Party with Roosevelt as standard-bearer. Taft – already unpopular with the public and not enjoying being President – decided to run, not in expectation of being re-elected but rather to preserve the GOP apparatus for future conservative action.

Because Taft made no efforts to campaign, he lost easily in most states; however, in Utah, a powerful political machine under long-serving senator and Mormon Apostle Reed Smoot had been developed to counter the anti-Mormon "American Party", which had become the effective opposition to the Republicans in local elections and had elected mayors in Salt Lake City. Combined with a very prosperous rural economy in both the farming and mining sectors, this produced strong loyalty among local Mormon communities to Taft, who was also supported by the local Mormon and non-Mormon press. Those supporting Roosevelt were viewed as "insincere" and as "office-seekers", although latterly such press criticism was toned down.

Taft was thus able to hold the state, with the maintenance of tariffs being critical for the 52 percent of Utahans who were farmers in 1912. Wilson and Roosevelt were most successful in the remote, less Mormon areas east of the Wasatch Mountains, and in some urban areas with more progressive tendencies. Socialist Eugene Debs, in the most successful of his five presidential campaigns, obtained eight percent of the vote but did much better than this in some mining areas.

Utah became one of the only two states to vote for Taft in 1912, the other being Vermont, and with 37.46% of the popular vote made the state his strongest victory in the election. This was the last presidential election until 1960 in which Utah did not back the national winner, and remains the last time the state voted differently than neighboring Idaho.

Results

Results by county

See also
 United States presidential elections in Utah
 1912 United States presidential election in Vermont - President William Howard Taft's other sole win in 1912

Notes

References

1912 Utah elections
Utah
1912